PHTPP is a synthetic, nonsteroidal, and highly selective antagonist of ERβ that is used in scientific research to study the function of this receptor. It possesses 36-fold selectivity for ERβ over ERα, and is a silent antagonist of ERβ.

See also 
 Propylpyrazoletriol (PPT)
 Methylpiperidinopyrazole (MPP)
 (R,R)-Tetrahydrochrysene ((R,R)-THC)
 Diarylpropionitrile (DPN)
 Prinaberel (ERB-041)
 Liquiritigenin
 Menerba
 WAY-200070

References 

Antiestrogens
Trifluoromethyl compounds
Phenols
Pyrazolopyrimidines